Folklore is a body of expressive culture shared by a particular group of people.

Folklore may also refer to:

Music 
 Folklore (Jorge Cafrune album), 1962
 Folklore (16 Horsepower album), 2002
 Folklore (Nelly Furtado album), 2003
 Folklore (Big Big Train album), 2016
 Folklore (Taylor Swift album), 2020
 Folklore: The Long Pond Studio Sessions (From the Disney+ Special), a 2020 live soundtrack album featuring songs from the Taylor Swift studio album
 Folklore: Live at the Village Vanguard, a 1994 Vincent Herring album
 "Folk Lore", a 1985 song by Hüsker Dü from New Day Rising
 Prestige Folklore, a subsidiary label of Prestige Records

Other uses
 Folklore (journal), the journal of The Folklore Society
 Folklore (TV series), a 2018 HBO Asia television series
 Folklore (video game), a 2007 PlayStation 3 video game
 Folklore (horse), a retired American Thoroughbred racehorse
 Folklore: The Long Pond Studio Sessions, a 2020 documentary concert film by Taylor Swift, or its associated live album

See also
 American Folklore Society, a US-based professional association for folklorists
 American Folklore Theatre, former name of Northern Sky Theater, a theater company in Wisconsin
 The Folklore Society, a UK association for the study of folklore
 Folklore studies
 Mathematical folklore or folk mathematics, the body of theorems, definitions, proofs, or mathematical facts or techniques that circulate among mathematicians by word of mouth but have not appeared in print